Balekundri (K.H.)  is a village in the southern state of Karnataka, India. It is located in the Belgaum taluk of Belgaum district in Karnataka.

Demographics
 India census, Balekundri (K.H.) had a population of 5032 with 2576 males and 2456 females.

See also
 Belgaum
 Districts of Karnataka

References

External links
 http://Belgaum.nic.in/

Villages in Belagavi district